Trupanea guttistella is a species of tephritid or fruit flies in the genus Trupanea of the family Tephritidae.

Distribution
Russia, China, Japan.

References

Tephritinae
Insects described in 1951
Diptera of Asia